When in Rome is a detective novel by Ngaio Marsh; it is the twenty-sixth novel to feature Roderick Alleyn, and was first published in 1970.  The novel takes place in Rome, and concerns a number of murders among a group of tourists visiting the city; much of the action takes place in the "Basilica di San Tommaso", which bears some resemblance to the Basilica of San Clemente, which the author visited 'when in Rome' on an Italian holiday in Summer 1968.

Marsh made extensive enquiries into forensic details and Italian police procedure, with which she admitted struggling. On receipt of the manuscript in January 1970, her agent Edmund Cork wrote to her that it was her best novel to date, a verdict with which her American agent agreed. The novel was favourably received by reviewers and sold very well.

Apart from the typically unusual and subtle murder mystery, presented within Marsh's characteristic comedy of manners, the novel gives a fine description of Rome's sights, smells and sounds, and of its multi-layered architecture and history, seen from the perspective of an exclusive group of English-speaking tourists. There is also a description of the 1968 student demonstrations, which Marsh herself witnessed briefly in Paris, and maybe this radicalism influenced this book's view of the aristocracy (of whom Marsh has sometimes been accused of a snobbishly uncritical over-fondness). The decadent Sonia, Lady Braceley and her nephew the Hon. Kenneth Dorne are depicted with relish and distaste as 'la dolce vita' at its most worthless, and given short shrift by Roderick Alleyn.

Adaptations
The novel was adapted into a 60 minutes radio play by the BBC starring Jeremy Clyde.

In 1970–1972, Ngaio Marsh worked on a stage adaptation of the novel with Barbara Toy, but this was never produced.

References

Roderick Alleyn novels
1970 British novels
Novels set in Rome
Collins Crime Club books
British detective novels